The Imam Reza shrine in Mashhad, Iran, is a complex which contains the mausoleum of Imam Reza, the eighth Imam of Twelver Shias. It is the largest mosque in the world by area. Also contained within the complex are the Goharshad Mosque, a museum, a library, four seminaries, a cemetery, the Razavi University of Islamic Sciences, a dining hall for pilgrims, vast prayer halls, and other buildings.

The complex is a tourism center in Iran and has been described as "the heart of the Shia Iran" with 25 million Iranian and non-Iranian Shias visiting the shrine each year, according to a 2007 estimate. The complex is managed by Astan Quds Razavi Foundation and currently headed by Ahmad Marvi, a prominent Iranian cleric.

Every year the ceremony of Dust Clearing is celebrated in the Imam Reza shrine.

Religious significance 
Shia sources quote several hadiths from the Shia Imams and Prophet Muhammad that highlight the importance of pilgrimage to the shrine. A hadith from the Islamic Prophet reads: One of my own flesh and blood will be buried in the land of Khorasan. God the Highest will surely remove the sorrows of any sorrowful person who goes on pilgrimage to his shrine. God will surely forgive the sins of any sinful person who goes on pilgrimage to his shrine.

History

Early years
Dar-ul-Imarah (Royal Residence) or the garden of Humayd ibn Qahtaba al-Ta'i was a fortress in the village of Sanabad. It dates back to the era before the Islam religion. It had been placed at the fork road of Sanabad, Neishabour, Sarakhs, Toos and Radkan. This fortress had been a place for the frontier guards to take position and establish the security of these roads and regions. After the demise of Harun al-Rashid, he was buried in this place. Due to this historical event, the Dar-ul-Imarah was known as the Mausoleum of Haruniyyeh. The original inner building of Dar-ul-Imarah had been a Zoroastrian temple. This building was demolished by the order of al-Ma'mun, and then it was reconstructed according to the special architecture of Khorasan. Four plain and short walls, covered with a low-slope dome, were constructed around the building. Afterwards, the name of the mausoleum (Haruniyyeh) was changed and known as the Mashhad-ur-Reza, due to the Holy Imam. Mashhad literally means a place where a martyr has been buried.

Martyrdom of Ali al-Ridha

In 818, Imam Ali al-Ridha was murdered by the Abbasid caliph al-Ma'mun (ruled 813–833) and was buried beside the grave of al-Ma'mun's father, Harun al-Rashid (r. 786–809). After this event, the location was called as Mashhad al-Ridha ("the place of martyrdom of al-Ridha"). Shias and Sunnis (for example, Ibn Hibban wrote in his Kitab al Siqqat that whenever troubled and in Mashad he would always visit the shrine to ask for relief from problems that bothered him) began visiting his grave on pilgrimage. By the end of the 9th century a dome was built on the grave and many buildings and bazaars sprang up around it. For the next thousand years, it has been devastated and reconstructed several times.

The celebrated Muslim traveler Ibn Battuta visited Mashhad in 1333 and reported that it was a large town with abundant fruit trees, streams and mills. A great dome of elegant construction surmounts the noble mausoleum, the walls being decorated with colored tiles. Opposite the tomb of the Imam is the tomb of Caliph Harun al-Rashid, which is surmounted by a platform bearing chandeliers.

Ghaznavid era
By the end of the third Hijri century, a dome was built on the grave of Imam Reza and many buildings and bazaars sprang around the holy shrine. In 383 A.H. / 993 A.D., Sebuktigin, the Ghaznavid sultan devastated Mashhad and stopped the pilgrims from visiting the holy shrine of Imam Reza. But in 400 A.H./ 1009 A.D., Mahmud of Ghazni (born 971, ruled, 998-1030 A.D.,) started the expansion and renovation of the holy shrine and built many fortifications around the city.

Saljug era

Sultan Sanjar (b. 1086 A.D., r. 1097-1157 A.D.), after the miraculous healing of his son in the holy shrine of Imam Reza, renovated the sanctuary and added new buildings within its precincts. At the time of Sultan Sanjar Saljuqi, after Sharaf al-Din Abu Tahir b. Sa'd b. Ali Qummi repaired the shrine, he began to construct a dome over it. In 612 A.H./ 1215 A.D., as borne out by inscriptions on certain tiles, Allaudin Khwarezm Shah carried out renovations on the shrine.

Mongol invasion
During the Khwarazmian dynasty, Razavi Shrine was paid much attention and some repair and decoration was made inside it. In this era (612 A.H./1215 A.D.), two very glorious embossed Thuluth (a large Naskh handwriting) inscriptions in form of square tile work were fixed on both sides of the shrine entrance-by the side of Dar al-Huffaz porch—in which the names and descent of Imam Reza back to Imam Ali were written. Some other inscriptions and three mihrabs (a special place for prayer-leader in mosques) belonging to this age exist in this holy complex.
During the Mongol invasion in 1220 A.D. (617 A.H.), Khorasan was plundered by the invading hordes and the survivors of this massacre took refuge in Mashhad and settled around the holy shrine. Sultan Muhammad Khudabandeh Iljaitu (b. 1282 AD), the Mongol ruler of Iran, converted to Shi'ism and ruled Iran in 703–716 A.H (1304–1316 AD), once again renovated the holy shrine on a grand scale.

Timurid era
The glorious phase of Mashhad started during the reign of Shahrukh Mirza (b. 1377 A.D., r, 1405–1447), son of Tamerlane, and reached its zenith during the reign of the Safavid Shahs who ruled Iran from 1501 to 1736. Shahrukh Mirza, whose capital was Herat, regularly visited Mashhad for the pilgrimage of the holy shrine of Imam Reza (A.S.). In the 15th century, during the reign of the Timurid Shahrukh Mirza, Mashhad became one of the main cities of the realm. In 1418, his wife Empress Goharshad funded the construction of an outstanding mosque beside the shrine, which is known as the Goharshad Mosque.

Safavid era

With the emergence of the Safavid dynasty in 1501 A.D. and their declaration of the Twelver Shi'ite sect as the state religion, Mashhad reached the peak of its development and soon became one of the greatest sites of pilgrimage. However, since Khorasan was a border province of the Safavid Empire, Mashhad suffered repeated invasions and periods of occupation by the Uzbek Khans – Muhammad Khan, Abdullah Khan Shaibani, Muhammad Sultan and especially Abdul-Momen Khan. These invasions continued up to 996 A.H./ 1586 A.D., the reign of Shah Abbas I, who finally drove out the Uzbeks from Khorasan.

Sahn Atiq was extended in the time of Shah Abbas I, and during the Safavid era, great efforts were made for its further improvement. Shah Tahmasp I began to repair and gild the minaret near the dome and in 932/1525, precious tiles covering the dome were changed into gold-coated bricks. After they were plundered during Abd al-Mu'min Khan Uzbek invasion, the gold-coated bricks were rebuilt by Shah 'Abbas in 1010/1601, the details of which was written on an enamelled inscription by Ali Reza Abbasi. Shah Abbas also began to establish northern porch, rooms, chambers, facades, as well eastern and western porches. It is said that Mullah Muhsin Fayd Kashani ordered to establish Tawhid Khanah portico in the north side of the Shrine. Allahverdikhan portico, porch in the north side of Dar al-Ziyafah (reception chamber) and Hatam Khani portico, all were built in the time of great princes of Safavids, Allahverdikhan and Hatam Beq Ordoobadi.

Shah Abbas II commanded to repair and tile Sahn Atiq and Shah Sulaiman also ordered the repair of the Holy Shrine Dome which had been split because of the earthquake; this can be read in an erected inscription. He also commanded to establish several Madrasahs (Islamic seminaries). The northern porch of Goharshad Mosque, the Holy Shrine entrance, along with Musallah (place of prayer) located in Payeen Khiyaban (lower street) were repaired and tiled by a skillful Isfahani mason called Ustad Shuja'.

During the Safavid era, the shrine also received patronage from rulers of the Indian subcontinent, namely Quli Qutb-ul-Mulk (founder of the Qutb Shahi dynasty) and Mughal Emperor Akbar. The latter was notably a Sunni.

Afsharid and Qajar era
 
 
Nader Shah Afshar (b. 1688, r. 1736-1747 A.D.) and the Qajar Shahs who ruled Iran from 1789 to 1925 illuminated, beautified and expanded the various courtyards (Sahn), porches (Riwaq) and places in the holy shrine. The golden porch of Sahn Atiq and the minaret on its top were repaired and gilded, the minaret of north porch was erected and illuminated; and Sangab (a vessel or container made of single block of marble) in Ismail Tala'ee Saqqa Khanah (a public place for drinking water) was built in Sahn Atiq. All these happened during Nader Shah Afshar's monarchy.

There were also some improvements in the Holy Shrine complex during the Qajar Dynasty, including new courtyard establishment and gilding its porch, both of them started during the reign of Fath-Ali Shah and finished during Naser al-Din Shah's reign. The porch and northern façade of Sahn Atiq, as written in the inscription of its top, were also repaired during Mohammad Shah Qajar's rule. Tawhid Khanah was repaired in 1276/1859 in the time of Adud al-Mulk's custodianship. He had the fine paintings and tiles of the Shrine decorated with mirrors in 1275/1858. Naser al-Din Shah, too, had the gold-coated bricks put up on the walls, from dado up to the top of western porch of the new courtyard and its stalactite-shaped ceiling. So it was called "Nasiri Porch". There was also some repair in both courtyards, the old and the new one during Mozaffar ad-Din Shah's monarchy.

Following the coup in December 1911, Russian artillery shelled revolutionaries who had taken refuge in the holy shrine. The whole complex was greatly damaged in 1911, but it was repaired again after a while by Hussein Mirza Nayyir al-Dawla, Khorasan's governor.

Modern era

There happened some essential changes round the complex in 1347/1928, when Falakah (round open space with the radius of 180 meters from the top of the Dome was established. Then they began to build the Museum, the library and the Hall for ceremonies. Old Falakah was extended up to a radius of 620 meters before the victory of the Islamic Revolution, and an important part of Holy Buildings' historical structure was demolished without considering its antiquity and elegance.

On 11th Rabi al-Thani 1354 A.H. /13 July 1935, during the Goharshad Mosque rebellion,  armed forces of Reza Shah (b. 1878, r. 1925-1941 A.D.), the reigning monarch of Iran and founder of Pahlavi dynasty, invaded the holy shrine and massacred people gathered in the Goharshad Mosque. The people there were protesting against the modernization policies of the Shah which many, especially amongst the Shia clergy, considered to be anti-Islamic, including the banning Hijab (headscarf) for women in Iran. Shortly before the Iranian Revolution, on 21 November 1978, troops under orders from the regime of Mohammad Reza Shah (b. 1919, r. 1941-1979 A.D.), Reza Shah's son and successor, killed a large number of people within the shrine.

The shrine is depicted on the reverse of the Iranian 100 rials coin, issued since 2004. It's also on new Iranian smart national card.

Incidents 

 1994 Imam Reza shrine bombing
 2022 Imam Reza shrine stabbings

Specifications

Courtyards (Sahn) 

The complex contains a total of seven courtyards, which cover an area of over : The courtyards also contain a total of 14 minarets, and three fountains.

Halls
From the courtyards, external hallways named after scholars lead to the inner areas of the mosque. They are referred to as Bast (Sanctuary), since they were meant to be a safeguard for the shrine areas:

 Bast Shaykh Toosi – leads to the Central Library
 Bast Shaykh Tabarsi
 Bast Shaykh Hur Ameli
 Bast Shaykh Baha'i

The Bast hallways lead towards a total of 21 internal halls (Riwaq) which surround the burial chamber of Ali al-Ridha. Adjacent to the burial chamber is also a mosque dating back to the 10th century known as, Bala-e-Sar Mosque.

Goharshad Mosque

This mosque is one of the most reputed in Iran and is situated adjacent to the Holy Shrine of Imam Ridha. It was built in 821 AH. under the orders of Goharshad Begum, Shahrukh Mirza's wife. Its area is 9410 Sq Meters and includes a courtyard, four porches and seven large prayer halls. Two minarets, each 40 meters high, are located on both sides of Maqsureh Porch. There is an inscription on the left on the margin of the porch written by Baisonqor, one of the best calligraphists of the time. The Sahib-al Zaman Pulpit is in Maqsureh porch. It was built in 1243 H with walnut wood and without using any iron or nail. This mosque has a public library with 34,650 volumes.

Ali al-Ridha's Tomb

It is located beneath the Golden Dome (The Golden Dome is the most prominent symbol of the city of Mashad with an altitude of 31.20 meters) and surrounded by different porches each bearing a separate name. The skilled artists have done their best in the creation of this place. It is square in shape and some 135 sq. meters have been added to its area after extension works. The walls are covered by marble up to twenty centimeters and the next ninety two centimeters are covered by expensive tiles known as Sultan Sanjari tiles. Quranic verses and Ahadiths of the Ahle Bait have been carved on these tiles. The important inscription written round the walls is eighty centimeters wide and written by Ali Ridha Abbasi, the famous calligraphist of the Safavid period and bears Surah Jumah of the Quran.

Museums and other historical appurtenants
There are two museums in the Holy shrine limits. Astan Quds Museum and Quran Museum.
The Astan Quds museum is one of the richest and most exquisite museums of Iran. The building is located in the eastern quarter of Sahne Imam Khomeini and close to Haram square. Some of its objects date back to the 6th century AH. The collection of carpets, rugs and golden covers for the Tomb are all unique and date back to the 11 and 13th centuries. Some inscriptions written by Ali Reza Abbasi are among the valuable objects. Among the unique works of art in the museum is Imam's first tombstone, the inscription of which was carved in kufi relief script belonging to 516 H.
Also Quran museum is located in the vicinity of the Astan Quds museum. It contains precious manuscripts of the Glorious Quran attributed to the Holy Imams and some gilded manuscripts. It was opened in 1364 H. The oldest manuscript attributed to the Holy Imams is in kufi script on deer skin belonging to the First century AH.

Because of historical background of Imam Reza shrine, it is collection of historical objects such as; Minarets, Nqqareh Khaneh (Place of Kettle Drums), Saqqa Khaneh (Public Drinking Place), Sa'at (the Clock), Dar-al Hoffaz (the place of the Reciters), Towhid Khaneh (place of Divine Unity), Dar-al-Siyadah, Bala-Sar Mosque, Dar-al Rahmah Porch, Allahverdi Khan Dome, Hatam Khani Dome, Golden Dome, Astan Quds Mehmansara.

Notable burials
 Imam Reza (765–818) – 8th Imam (798–818)
 Shaykh Tabarsi (1073–1153) – Scholar 
 Sultanum Begum (1516–1593) – Queen consort
 Allahverdi Khan (ალავერდი ხანი უნდილაძე) (ca. 1560–1613) – Iranian general of Georgian origin
 Sheikh-e Baha'i (1547–1621) – Scholar
 Dilaram Khanum (d. 1647) – Queen consort
 Horr-e Ameli (1624–1693) – cleric
 Crown Prince Abbas Mirza (1789–1833) – Qajar Crown Prince
 Prince Mohammad-Taqi Mirza (1791–1853) – Qajar prince
 Mohammad-Baqer Sharif Tabatabai (1823–1901) – Scholar
 Abutaleb Zanjani (1843–1911) – Scholar
 Princess Ashraf os-Saltaneh (1863–1914) – photographer
 Prince Mass'oud Mirza Zell-e Soltan (1850–1918) – Qajar prince
 Hassan Ali Nokhodaki Isfahani (1862–1942) – cleric
 Ahmed Aref El-Zein (1884–1960) – Scholar
 Forough Azarakhshi (1904–1963) – scholar
 Mohammad-Taqi Amoli (1887–1971) – cleric
 Ali-Akbar Fayyaz (1898–1971) – scholar
 Mohammad-Hadi Milani (1895–1975) – Scholar
 Manouchehr Eghbal (1909–1977) – prime minister (1957–60) and CEO of NIOC
 Asadollah Alam (1919–1978) – prime minister (1962–64) and minister of the Imperial Court (1967–77)
 Gholam-Hossein Tabrizi (1881–1980) – Scholar
 َAli Motamedi (fa) (1896–1980) – diplomat and politician
 Mahmoud Farrokh Khorasani (fa) (1895–1981) – politician
 Abdolkarim Hasheminejad (1932–1981) – cleric
 Abdollah Musavi Shirazi (1892–1984) – cleric
 Gholamreza Ghodsi (1925–1989) – poet
 Badri Teymourtash (1908–1995) – scholar
 Mohammad-Taqi Jafari (1925–1998) – cleric
 Ali-Akbar Aboutorabi Fard (1939–2000) – cleric
 Hassan-Ali Morvarid (1911–2004) – cleric
 Jalaleddin Ashtiani (1925–2005) – cleric
 Hassan Tabatabaei Qomi (1912–2007) – cleric
 Mohammad-Sadegh Farman (fa) (1921–2012) – politician
 Mohammad Ezodin Hosseini Zanjani (1921–2013) – cleric
 Mohammad Baqer Shirazi (1931–2014) – cleric
 Abbas Vaez-Tabasi (1935–2016) – cleric and chairman of the supervisory board of Astan Quds Razavi (1979–2016)
 Hassan Firouzabadi (1951–2021) - military commander and Chief of Staff of the Iranian Armed Forces (1989–2016)
 Harun al-Rashid (763–809) - Abbasid caliph (786–809)

Gallery

See also
 Holiest sites in Shia Islam
 Astan Quds Razavi
 Fatima Masumeh Shrine
 Shah Abdol-Azim Shrine
 Goharshad Mosque
 Howz-e Ma'jardar Mosque

References

Bibliography
 D. M. Donaldson: 'Significant Miḥrābs in the Ḥaram at Mas̱ẖhad', A. Islam., ii (1935), pp. 118–27
 A. U. Pope and P. Ackerman, eds: Survey of Persian Art (2/1964–7), pp. 1201–11
 B. Saadat: The Holy Shrine of Imam Reza, Mashhad, 4 vols (Shiraz, 1976)
 Nasrine Hakami, Pèlerinage de l'Emâm Rezâ: Étude Socio-économique (Tokyo: Institute for the Study of Languages and Cultures of Asia and Africa, 1989) 
 C. P. Melville: 'Shah ‛Abbas and the Pilgrimage to Mashhad', Safavid Persia: The History and Politics of an Islamic Society, ed. C. P. Melville (London, 1996), pp. 191–229

External links

Astan Quds Razavi 
Non-Iranian Pilgrims Website 
Razavi Pharmaceutical Service Institute

Shia shrines
Safavid architecture
Buildings and structures in Mashhad
Mosques in Iran
Cemeteries in Iran
Shia cemeteries
Islamic Republic of Iran era architecture
Shrines in Iran
Tourist attractions in Razavi Khorasan Province
National works of Iran
Burial sites of the Abbasid dynasty
Imam Reza shrine